Hema is a Bantu language and one of three languages spoken by the Hema people of the Democratic Republic of the Congo.

Hema is sometimes called Southern Hema in contrast to the unrelated language Lendu, also known as Northern Hema.

The ethnically Hema dialect of Nyankore, called Hima, is related but distinct.

References

Languages of the Democratic Republic of the Congo
Nyoro-Ganda languages